Ivalo is a village in the municipality of Inari, Lapland, Finland, located on the Ivalo River  south of Lake Inari in the Arctic Circle. It has a population of 3,998  and a small airport.  south of Ivalo is a very popular resort named Saariselkä.
Many tourists visit this place every year for winter sports (downhill and cross-country skiing, snowboarding, husky and reindeer sledge riding) and for summer activities (trekking and hiking in the Saariselkä fjells, canoeing in Lapland's rivers, mountain biking, panning for gold, fishing, etc.).

Ivalo was severely damaged during the Lapland War (1944–1945) by retreating German troops led by Generaloberst Lothar Rendulic. The village was subsequently extensively rebuilt.

The "midnight sun" is above the horizon from 24 May to 22 July (70 days), and the period with continuous daylight lasts a bit longer. The polar night is from 28 November to 9 January (43 days).

History 
The village of Kyrö was established in the 1750s by the Finnish settler Henrik (Heikki) Mikonpoika Kyrö, who came from the Tornio valley. Before settling in Inari, he spent some time in Enontekiö and Kittilä.

Ivalo was officially a separate village since the mid-19th century, but the name only gained wide usage in the early 20th century. Some people in Inari also knew it as Iivalo. Ivalo started growing after a road leading to Petsamo was built. Kyrö had been fully merged into Ivalo by 1940.

See also 
 Inari (village)

References

External links 
 

Villages in Inari, Finland